Rhea Raj (born 5 April 2000) is an American singer, actress, songwriter and pop artist based in New York. She auditioned for American Idol in 2016 and was featured on MTV for her two covers of "New Rules" by Dua Lipa and "I Got You". Her songs "2AM" and "Royalty" with UpsideDown were released in 2019. Her music fuses pop with dance and hip hop.

Early life 
Rhea was born in Stamford, Connecticut to Indian parents, and grew up in New Jersey before moving to New York. Her mother taught her Indian classical music and she learned Bollywood dance at home, where Rhea first developed an interest in music. Since she was 10 years old, she started musical training.

Discography 
“2AM” (with UpsideDown) (2019)
“Royalty” (with UpsideDown and Happy Singh) (2019)
“You’re a Star” (2019)
“Need Me” (with UpsideDown and Happy Singh) (2019)
“Overdose” (2020)
“Go Down” (2020)
“We Outside” (2022)

References 

Living people
2000 births
American women songwriters
American actresses of Indian descent
American women singers of Indian descent
Place of birth missing (living people)
21st-century American singers
21st-century American actresses
21st-century American women singers
American women pop singers